Hillsea Point Rock is an area of the English Channel located 0.5 nm south-east of Hillsea Point, Devon. It consists of seven or eight pinnacles ranging in depth between 25 metres on the sea bed and 2 metres at the surface

The crack is narrow at the top but is about 1 metre wide at a depth of about 23 metres providing a "swim through" of about 15 metres for divers.

References

Underwater diving sites in England
South Hams